Timmalapura is a temple city in Bellary district, Karnataka

Attractions

References

Hindu temples in Bellary district